Alexey Sambuevich Tsydenov (born March 16, 1976) is a Russian politician who has been acting Head of the Republic of Buryatia since his appointment by Vladimir Putin on February 7, 2017.

Early life and education
Tsydenov was born in Petrovsk-Zabaykalsky, Chita Oblast, Russian SFSR, USSR. His father was a Buryat, while his mother was ethnic Russian. From 1998 to 2001 he worked for the Far Eastern Railway as an accountant, sector chief and department head. From 2002 to 2004 he was general director of "Dalneftetrans" LLC and from 2004 to 2006 general director of "Far Eastern Transport Group" OJSC.

Career
From 2006 to 2009 he worked as deputy director of the railway policy department of the Ministry of Transport. From 2009 to 2012 he was a deputy director at the Department of Industry and Infrastructure. In 2011, he retrained at the Russian Presidential Academy of National Economy and Public Administration.

From December 2011 to May 2012 he was the head of the Federal Agency for Railway Transport. From June 18, 2012, to February 7, 2017, he was Deputy Minister of Transport of the Russian Federation. In 2016, he joined the board of directors of Russian Railways.

On February 7, 2017, Vladimir Putin appointed him acting head of the Republic of Buryatia "before taking office the person elected by the Head of the Republic of Buryatia".

His civil service "class rate" is "Active State Counsellor of the Russian Federation, 2nd class adviser". His total declared income for 2015 was 3.3 million rubles. He is married and has four children.

References

External links 
Цыденов Алексей Самбуевич
Алексей Цыденов рассказал о своей семье
Алексей Цыденов назначен временно исполняющим обязанности Главы Республики Бурятия

1976 births
People from Buryatia
Living people
United Russia politicians
21st-century Russian politicians
Heads of the Republic of Buryatia
Russian Presidential Academy of National Economy and Public Administration alumni